Erik Crone (29 May 1919 – 27 February 1945) was a member of the Danish resistance executed by the German occupying power.

Biography 

Erik Crone was born in Aarhus 29 May 1919 to Captain in the artillery Gustav Crone and wife Dorothy Victoria née La Cour and baptized in St. John's church in Aarhus on 18 July the same year.

Crone's membership of the resistance was betrayed to Gestapo by Jørgen Børge Axel Lorenzen, leader of the infamous Lorenzen Group and on 19 December 1944 Crone was arrested. Lorenzen was executed in 1949 in part because of this.

On 27 February 1945 Crone and nine other resistance members were executed in Ryvangen.

After his death 

On 23 June 1945 an inquest determined that the cause of death was ballistic trauma.

On 29 August Crone and 105 other victims of the occupation were given a state funeral in the memorial park founded at the execution and burial site in Ryvangen where he was executed. Bishop Hans Fuglsang-Damgaard led the service with participation from the royal family, the government and representatives of the resistance movement.

Erik Crone is named with 24 others who died in the resistance on a memorial plaque at the Frue Plads gate of the University of Copenhagen.

References 

1919 births
1945 deaths
People executed by Nazi Germany by firing squad
Danish resistance members
Danish people executed by Nazi Germany
Resistance members killed by Nazi Germany
People from Aarhus